Mudhole is a town in Nirmal district in the state of Telangana in India. It is very near to the Basar Saraswati Temple.

Geography
Mudhole is a town and Constituency of Nirmal District. 
It has an average elevation of 346 meters (1138 feet).population is15000
     venkatapuram rajendar an youngster software employee won sarpanch elections fought as independent in recent elections

References

Villages in Nirmal district